Physics education or physics education refers to the education methods currently used to teach physics. The occupation is called physics educator or physics teacher. Physics education research refers to an area of pedagogical research that seeks to improve those methods. Historically, physics has been taught at the high school and college level primarily by the lecture method together with laboratory exercises aimed at verifying concepts taught in the lectures. These concepts are better understood when lectures are accompanied with demonstration, hand-on experiments, and questions that require students to ponder what will happen in an experiment and why. Students who participate in active learning for example with hands-on experiments learn through self-discovery. By trial and error they learn to change their preconceptions about phenomena in physics and discover the underlying concepts. Physics education is part of the broader area of science education.

Ancient Greece
Aristotle wrote what is considered now as the first textbook of physics. Aristotle's ideas were taught unchanged until the Late Middle Ages, when scientists started making discoveries that didn't fit them. For example, Copernicus' discovery contradicted Aristotle's idea of an Earth-centric universe. Aristotle's ideas about motion weren't displaced until the end of the 17th century, when Newton published his ideas.

Today's physics students often think of physics concepts in Aristotelian terms, despite being taught only Newtonian concepts.

Hong Kong

High schools
In Hong Kong, physics is a subject for public examination. Local students in Form 6 take the public exam of Hong Kong Diploma of Secondary Education (HKDSE).

Compare to the other syllabus include GCSE, GCE etc. which learn wider and boarder of different topics, the Hong Kong syllabus is learning more deeply and more challenges with calculations. Topics are narrow down to a smaller amount compared to the A-level due to the insufficient teaching hours at secondary schools in Hong Kong, which include temperature, heat, internal energy, change of state, gases, position, motion, force, projectile motion, work, energy, power, momentum, uniform circular motion, gravitation, wave, light, sound, electrostatics, circuits, electromagnetism, radiation, radioactivity, atomic model, nuclear energy, universe, astronomy, stars, Rutherford model, photoelectric effect, Bohr model, particles, nanoscopic scale, building, transportation, renewable energy sources, eye, ear, non-ionizing radiation and ionizing radiation etc.

Some schools only allow students choose physics as elective subject since Form 4, some schools provide physics compulsory curriculum in Form 3 and then allow students to choose in Form 4, and some other schools allow students choose physics as elective subject since Form 3. Also, most schools use English language as the medium of instruction for physics, whereas a few of the schools use Chinese language as the medium of instruction for physics.

Other than having lectures in classrooms or laboratories, schools in Hong Kong organise outside-school activities to motivate students learning Physics.

Universities
Pure Physics major programmes are provided in the Chinese University of Hong Kong (CUHK), Hong Kong University of Science and Technology (HKUST) and University of Hong Kong (HKU). Topics include engineering physics, mechanics, thermodynamics, fluids, wave, optics, modern physics, laboratory, heat, electromagnetism, quantitative methods, computational physics, astronomy, astrophysics, classical mechanics, quantum mechanics, quantum information, statistical physics, theoretical physics, computer simulation, soft matter, practical electronics, contemporary physics, instrumentation, statistical mechanics, solid state physics, meteorology, nanoscience, optical physics, theory of relativity and particle physics etc.

There are different approaches of delivering physics lectures in different universities in Hong Kong. In CUHK, most relevant knowledge including quantitative methods and computer simulation are learnt in the Department of Physics, which may let the students learn deeper into the concept that applied to the physics problems, whereas in HKUST, quantitative methods and computer simulation are learnt by students in the courses delivered by Department of Mathematics and Department of Computer Science respectively which allow the students to learn boarder with knowledge of different aspects.

There are also Enrichment Stream in Theoretical Physics offered by CUHK and International Research Enrichment Track offered by HKUST. In that stream, additional topics include astrophysics, particle physics, computational physics, and quantum physics. The practices of solving theoretical systems and the discussions of physical insight are very in-depth, which promote the graduates into a high level of the understanding of physics. However, the working opportunity for graduates with theoretical background in Hong Kong is too narrow. Most graduates pursue further studies overseas or become teachers.

Moreover, Applied Physics major programmes are offered only in most other universities in Hong Kong.

United Kingdom

Secondary schools

England, Wales and Northern Ireland
At GCSE level, students can choose to study physics either as a whole subject separate from biology and chemistry (referred to as "triple science") or as part of a so-called "combined science" course, in which all three sciences are sandwiched into a single qualification worth two GCSEs. At GCSE, students are taught the basics of a broad range of physical concepts including energy, waves, Newtonian mechanics, electricity, thermal physics and nuclear physics among others. There is also a practical element (known as "required practicals"), which is conducted in the classroom and then assessed via questions in the final exam papers. Because of this, it is theoretically possible for students to pass the GCSE required practical element without doing a single experiment.

Students wishing to continue to study physics after their GCSEs may then choose to study the subject as an A-level qualification (lasting two years) or an AS-level (lasting one year). A-level physics also includes required practicals, but unlike at GCSE, these are assessed in-class by teachers. Students who pass are given "practical accreditation", which some universities require before allowing a student onto certain science courses. There are still questions in the final exams regarding practical technique, but answering these questions correctly does not contribute to practical accreditation. Much of the content of A-level physics is elaborating (albeit quite extensively) on topics covered at GCSE, with the addition of units not present in the GCSE course, such as particle physics. Despite containing significantly less mathematical rigour nowadays than in the past, physics is still widely regarded as the most demanding A-level course available, and is one of the least popular subjects in proportion to its availability. There is some concern that not enough 17- to 18-year-olds are leaving school with A-level physics to meet the demands of the modern job market.

Scotland
In Scotland, Highers and Advanced Highers replace GCSEs and A-levels respectively. The content of the qualifications is fairly similar. Since Scottish post-16 school students finish school a year earlier than their counterparts in the rest of the UK, the content of the first year of the physics degrees offered at most Scottish universities is similar to the second year of A-level physics.

Universities
Most university physics courses in the UK have their content moderated by the Institute of Physics (IOP) and are referred to as being "IOP-accredited". The aim of this is to ensure that all physics students graduate with the knowledge and skills required to work as a professional physicist. Physics can be studied as a 3-year Bachelor of Science degree (4 years in Scotland) or as an integrated Master's degree, in which students who pass the first 3 or 4 years then take a final "master's year" without having to apply again for any Master's courses. Alternatively, students who initially apply to study BSc Physics can apply to study for a Master's degree when they graduate.

Teaching strategies
Teaching strategies are the various techniques used to facilitate the education of students with different learning styles.
The different teaching strategies are intended to help students develop critical thinking and engage with the material.
The choice of teaching strategy depends on the concept being taught, and indeed on the interest of the students.

Methods/Approaches for teaching physics
 Lecture:  Lecturing is the one of the more traditional ways of teaching science. Owing to the convenience of this method, and the fact that most teachers are taught by it, it remains popular in spite of certain limitations (compared to other methods, it does little to develop critical thinking and scientific attitude among students). This method is teacher centric.
 Recitation:  Also known as the Socratic method. In this method, the student plays a greater role than they would in a lecture. The teacher asks questions with the aim of prompting the thoughts of the students. This method can be very effective in developing higher order thinking in pupils. To apply this strategy, the students should be partially informed about the content. The efficacy of the recitation method depends largely on the quality of the questions. This method is student centric.
 Demonstration: In this method, the teacher performs certain experiments, which students observe and ask questions about. After the demonstration, the teacher can explain the experiment further and test the students' understanding via questions. This method is an important one, as science is not an entirely theoretical subject.
 Lecture-cum-Demonstration: As its name suggests, this is a combination of two of the above methods: lecture and demonstration. The teacher performs the experiment and explains it simultaneously. By this method, the teacher can provide more information in less time. As with the demonstration method, the students only observe; they do not get any practical experience of their own. It is not possible to teach all topics by this method.
Laboratory Activities: Laboratories have students conduct physics experiments and collect data by interacting with physics equipment. Generally, students follow instructions in a lab manual. These instructions often take students through an experiment step-by-step. Typical learning objectives include reinforcing the course content through real-world interaction (similar to demonstrations) and thinking like experimental physicists. Lately, there has been some effort to shift lab activities toward the latter objective by separating from the course content, having students make their own decisions, and calling to question the notion of a "correct" experimental result. Unlike the demonstration method, the laboratory method gives students practical experience performing experiments like professional scientists. However, it often requires a significant amount of time and resources to work properly.

Research

Physics education research is the study of how physics is taught and how students learn physics. It a subfield of educational research.

See also

 American Association of Physics Teachers
 Balsa wood bridge
 Concept inventory
 Egg drop competition
 Feynman lectures
 Harvard Project Physics
 Learning Assistant Model
 List of physics concepts in primary and secondary education curricula
 Mousetrap car
 Physical Science Study Committee
 Physics First
 SAT Subject Test in Physics
 Physics Outreach
 Science education
 Mathematics education
 Engineering education
 Discipline-based education research

References

Further reading

PER Reviews:
 
 

Miscellaneous:
 
 
 

 
Education by subject